Vining is a city in Clay and Washington counties in Kansas, United States.  As of the 2020 census, the population of the city was 43.

History
Vining was originally called West Clifton, and under the latter name was laid out in 1877. It was renamed Vining in 1881, in honor of E. P. Vining, a railroad agent.

Vining was once an important shipping point, being situated on the Republican River and at the junction of two railroads.

The post office in Vining closed in 1955.

Geography
Vining is located at  (39.567460, -97.293109). The city is located next to Clifton.

Demographics

2010 census
As of the census of 2010, there were 45 people, 24 households, and 13 families living in the city. The racial makeup of the city was 100.0% White.

There were 24 households, of which 25.0% had children under the age of 18 living with them, 33.3% were married couples living together, 4.2% had a female householder with no husband present, 16.7% had a male householder with no wife present, and 45.8% were non-families. 41.7% of all households were made up of individuals, and 20.8% had someone living alone who was 65 years of age or older. The average household size was 1.88 and the average family size was 2.54.

The median age in the city was 41.5 years. 20% of residents were under the age of 18; 6.6% were between the ages of 18 and 24; 31% were from 25 to 44; 28.9% were from 45 to 64; and 13.3% were 65 years of age or older. The gender makeup of the city was 57.8% male and 42.2% female.

2000 census
As of the census of 2000, there were 58 people, 26 households, and 15 families living in the city. The racial makeup of the city was 98.28% White and 1.72% Native American.

There were 26 households, out of which 23.1% had children under the age of 18 living with them, 50.0% were married couples living together, 3.8% had a female householder with no husband present, and 42.3% were non-families. 38.5% of all households were made up of individuals, and 11.5% had someone living alone who was 65 years of age or older. The average household size was 2.23 and the average family size was 3.07.

In the city, the population was spread out, with 25.9% under the age of 18, 6.9% from 18 to 24, 19.0% from 25 to 44, 36.2% from 45 to 64, and 12.1% who were 65 years of age or older. The median age was 40 years. For every 100 females, there were 100.0 males. For every 100 females age 18 and over, there were 126.3 males.

The median income for a household in the city was $27,500, and the median income for a family was $28,750. Males had a median income of $28,750 versus $8,750 for females. The per capita income for the city was $26,924. There were no families and 2.2% of the population living below the poverty line, including no under eighteens and none of those over 64.

Education
The community is served by Clifton-Clyde USD 224 public school district, which has three schools:
 Clifton-Clyde Senior High School, located in Clyde.
 Clifton-Clyde Middle School, located in Clifton.
 Clifton-Clyde Grade School, located in Clifton.

References

Further reading

External links
 Vining - Directory of Public Officials
 Vining city map, KDOT

Cities in Kansas
Cities in Clay County, Kansas
Cities in Washington County, Kansas
1877 establishments in Kansas
Populated places established in 1877